Eva Moore (1868–1955) was an English actress.

Eva Moore may also refer to:
Eva Perry Moore, American clubwoman
Eva Moore (Doctors), a character in the soap opera Doctors 
Eva Moore, a character in the TV series iZombie

See also
Ava Moore, a character in the TV series Nip/Tuck